Joseph Wiseman (May 15, 1918 – October 19, 2009) was a Canadian-American theatre, film, and television actor who starred as the villain Julius No in the first James Bond film, Dr. No, in 1962. Wiseman was also known for his role as Manny Weisbord on the TV series Crime Story, and his career on Broadway. He was once called "the spookiest actor in the American theatre".

Early life
Wiseman was born in Montreal, Quebec, Canada, to parents Louis and Pearl Wiseman and was raised in New York City, United States. At age 16, he began performing in summer stock and became professional, which displeased his parents.

He was an alumnus of John Adams High School, Queens, New York, and was graduated June 1935, as was his Dr. No co-star, Jack Lord.

Career
Wiseman made his Broadway debut in 1938, playing a small part in Robert E. Sherwood's Abe Lincoln in Illinois. Among the many productions he appeared in live theatre, were the title role in In the Matter of J. Robert Oppenheimer on Broadway in 1968, and the role of Father Massieu in the original Broadway production of Joan of Lorraine, the Maxwell Anderson play which eventually became the film Joan of Arc.

Wiseman appeared in several films in the 1950s. He made his first major film appearance in 1951's Detective Story, where he recreated his performance from Broadway as an unstable small-time hood. Soon after, he played Marlon Brando's archenemy in Viva Zapata! (1952). Wiseman's role as the titular Dr. No in the first James Bond film by Eon Productions was a decision of producer Harry Saltzman, who cast Wiseman in the role in December 1961. It was Wiseman's performance in Detective Story that gained him the part. (Later in his life, he viewed the film with disdain, and preferred to be remembered for his theater career.)

In 1967, he was cast as Billy Minsky's father in The Night They Raided Minsky's; later he appeared opposite Sir Laurence Olivier in The Betsy (1978). Wiseman had roles in a wide variety of other films: The Apprenticeship of Duddy Kravitz, Seize the Day, Bye Bye Braverman. In addition to being a regular on the series Crime Story, he had guest-starring and cameo roles in TV series including The Westerner; The Streets of San Francisco; The Untouchables; The Twilight Zone ("One More Pallbearer");  Magnum, P.I.; Buck Rogers in the 25th Century; and Night Gallery. His last film was released in 1988, though he appeared in TV shows such as MacGyver, L.A. Law, and Law & Order after that time. Wiseman's last appearance on television was the supporting role of Seymour Bergreen on a 1996 episode of Law & Order titled "Family Business". His last Broadway appearance was in Judgment at Nuremberg in 2001.

Following the death of Charles Gray in 2000, Wiseman was the last surviving main villain of the James Bond films that Sean Connery made for United Artists.

Personal life and death
Wiseman married Nell Kinard on August 25, 1943, in New York, but they eventually divorced May 15, 1964, in Durham, NC. He was married to dancer, teacher, and choreographer Pearl Lang from 1964 until her death in February 2009. Wiseman died on October 19, 2009, at his home in Manhattan aged 91, having been in declining health for some time. He is survived by his daughter, Martha Graham Wiseman, and his sister, Ruth Wiseman.

Filmography

 With These Hands (1950) as Mike Deleo
 Detective Story (1951) as Charley Gennini
 Viva Zapata! (1952) as Fernando Aguirre
 Les Misérables (1952) as Genflou
 Champ for a Day (1953) as Dominic Guido
 The Silver Chalice (1954) as Mijamin
 The Prodigal (1955) as Carmish
 Three Brave Men (1956) as Jim Barron
 The Garment Jungle (1957) as George Kovan
 The Unforgiven (1960) as Abe Kelsey
 The Happy Thieves (1961) as Jean Marie Calbert
 Dr. No (1962) as Dr. Julius No
 Bye Bye Braverman (1968) as Felix Ottensteen
 The Counterfeit Killer (1968) as Rajeski
 The Night They Raided Minsky's (1968) as Louis Minsky
 Stiletto (1969) as Emilio Matteo
 The Mask of Sheba (1970) as Bondelok
 Lawman (1971) as Lucas
 The Valachi Papers (1972) as Salvatore Maranzano
 Pursuit (1972) as Dr. Nordmann
 The Apprenticeship of Duddy Kravitz (1974) as Benjy Kravitz
 Journey into Fear (1975) as Col. Haki
 Murder at the World Series (1977) as Sam Druckman
 The Betsy (1978) as Jake Weinstein
 Buck Rogers in the 25th Century (1979) as Draco
 Jaguar Lives! (1979) as Ben Ashir
 Masada (1981) as Jerahmeel
 Seize the Day (1986) as Dr. Adler

TV (Selected) 

 The Untouchables: Episode: "The Antidote" (1961) as Russell Shield
 The Untouchables: Episode: "The Tommy Karpeles Story" (1961) as Albert Maris
 The Twilight Zone: Episode: "One More Pallbearer" (1962) as Paul Radin
 Wagon Train: Episode: "The Santiago Quesada Story" (1964) as Jim Case
 Men of the Dragon (1974 ABC Movie of the Week) as Balashev
 QB VII (1974, Mini-series) as Morris Cady
 Zalmen or the Madness of God (1975, Broadway Theatre Archive) as Rabbi
 Greatest American Hero: Episode: "Don't Mess Around with Jim" (1981) as James J. Beck
 Magnum, P.I.: Episode: "Birdman of Budapest" (1983) as Dr. Albert Tessa
 A-Team: Episode: "The Bells of St. Mary's" (1984) as Zeke Westerland
 The Equalizer: Episode: "The Confirmation Day" (1985) as Eddie Vanessi
 Crime Story (1988) as Manny Weisbord
 MacGyver: Episode: "The Battle of Tommy Giordano" (1989) as Joe Catano
 L.A. Law: Season 8, Episode 22, "Finish Line" (1994) as Isidore Schoen
 Law & Order: Season 7, Episode 8, "Family Business" (1996) as Seymour Bergreen (final appearance)

References

External links

 
 
 
 
 The O'Neill Theater Center

1918 births
2009 deaths
20th-century Canadian male actors
Canadian emigrants to the United States
Canadian male film actors
Actors from Quebec
Anglophone Quebec people
American male film actors
American male stage actors
American male television actors
Male actors from Quebec
Male actors from Montreal
Male actors from New York City
Université de Montréal alumni
John Adams High School (Queens) alumni
Canadian male stage actors
Canadian male television actors